Sreebardi is an upazila of Sherpur District in the Division of Mymensingh, Bangladesh.

Geography
It has 47900 households and total area 270.34 km2. It is bounded by Meghalaya state of India on the north, Sherpur sadar upazila on the south, Jhenaigati upazila on the east, Bakshiganj and Islampur upazila on the west.

Demographics
According to the 2001 Bangladesh census, Sreebardi had a population of 242320; males constituted 125039, females 117281; Muslim 237863, Hindu 3283, Buddhist 1141 and others 33.

As of the 1991 Bangladesh census, the upazila had a population of 228194. Males constituted 50.88% of the population, and females 49.12%. This Upazila's eighteen up population was 109693. Sreebardi had an average literacy rate of 18.5% (7+ years), and the national average of 32.4% literate.

Administration
Sreebardi Thana, now an upazila, was formed on 31 March 1918. Sreebardi Municipality was formed in 24 September 2004.

The Upazila is divided into Sreebardi Municipality and ten union parishads: Bhelua, Garjaripa, Gosaipur, Kakilakura, Kharia Kazirchar, Kurikahonia, Ranishimul, Singabaruna, Sreebordi, and Tatihati. The union parishads are subdivided into 81 mauzas and 142 villages.

Sreebardi Municipality is subdivided into 9 wards and 20 mahallas.

See also
Upazilas of Bangladesh
Districts of Bangladesh
Divisions of Bangladesh

References

Upazilas of Sherpur District